The Tower of David is the northeast tower of the Citadel of Jerusalem. It has been identified as either the Phasael Tower or the Hippicus Tower described by Josephus.

The towers named Phasael, Hippicus and Mariamne were situated in the northwest corner of the so-called First Wall, the Hasmonean and Herodian city wall protecting the Western Hill of Jerusalem. They were situated close to where the Jaffa Gate is today and were built by Herod the Great at the same time he built his immediately adjacent royal palace. These towers protected the main entrance to the city, as well as the palace, constituting a potential last refuge for the king. All three towers have vanished except for the base of the Hippicus (or Phasael) Tower, upon which the present "Tower of David" rests.

The towers were named by Herod after his brother Phasael, his friend and general Hippicus who had fallen in battle, and his favourite wife, Mariamne.

When the city was razed in 70 AD, all three towers were left standing, in order to show off the strength of the fortifications the Roman army had to overcome. With time though, only one of Herod's towers survived  - either Phasael, or according to some, including archaeologist Hillel Geva who excavated the Citadel, Hippicus. The Citadel was gradually built up under Muslim and Crusader rule and acquired the basis of its present shape in 1310, under the Mamluk sultan Malik al-Nasir. Suleiman the Magnificent later constructed the monumental gateway in the east that you enter through today. The minaret, a prominent Jerusalem landmark, was added between 1635 and 1655, and took over the title of "Tower of David" in the nineteenth century, so that the name can now refer to either the whole Citadel or the minaret alone.

On the site itself, from the top of the Hippicus (or Phasael) Tower, there are good views over the excavations inside the Citadel and out to the Old City, as well as into the distance south and west. Of the original tower itself, some sixteen courses of the original stone ashlars can still be seen rising from ground level, upon which were added smaller stones in a later period, which added significantly to its height. On the way up, a terrace overlooking the diggings has plaques identifying the different periods of all the remains. These include part of the Hasmonean city wall, a Roman cistern, and the ramparts of the Umayyad citadel, which held out for five weeks before falling to the Crusaders in 1099.

Gallery

References 

Towers
Classical sites in Jerusalem
Medieval sites in Jerusalem
Establishments in the Herodian kingdom
Archaeological sites in Jerusalem